Modà is an Italian pop band from Milan. Formed in 2002, the band currently consists of lead singer Kekko Silvestre, guitarists Diego Arrigoni and Enrico Zapparoli, bass guitarist Stefano Forcella and drummer Claudio Dirani.

History

2000–2003: Early years
In the early 2000s, Kekko Silvestre met musicians Tino Alberti and Enrico Palmosi. Later joined by Silvestre's childhood friend Paolo Bovi, they formed a band, Pop Doc, which performed in local clubs in Northern Italy. Silvestre later decided to rename the band after a discothèque in Erba, Lombardy. In 2001, Modà recorded their first demos, but during the summer of the same year, Palmosi left the group, later becoming the arranger of most of Modà's songs.

The following year, Silvestre met Diego Arrigoni, who became the band's guitarist. Shortly after, Stefano Forcella and Manuel Signoretto became Modà's bass guitarist and drummer, respectively.

2003–2005: Debut album and Sanremo Music Festival
In May 2003, Modà released their first self-produced EP, titled Via d'uscita. 
During one of their concerts, Modà were noted by Marco Sfratato, who was interested in their music and introduced the band to Pippo Landro, director of the independent record label New Music International. That way, Modà obtained their first recording contract. The band's debut album was released in October of the following year. Titled Ti amo veramente, the album was preceded by the single with the same title, which became a minor hit in Italy. The album also spawned the singles "Dimmi che non hai paura", released on 10 September 2004, and "Nuvole di rock".

In March 2005, the band participated in the Newcomers' Section of the 55th Sanremo Music Festival, performing their entry "Riesci a innamorarmi".
Paolo Bovi later revealed that they initially submitted the song "Mia", but they had to change it at the last time because it was already known among Modà's friends and funs, while the rules of the competition require competing song to be completely unknown to the audience.
"Riesci a innamorarmi" was eliminated during the first stage of the competition. Included in a new edition of Modà's debut album, the song peaked at number 41 on the Italian Singles Chart.

2006–2009: The Around the Music-era
During the Sanremo Music Festival 2005, problems in the relationship with their recording label started to arise, later leading the band to leave New Music and to sign a new contract with the independent label Around the Music.

In 2006, Paolo Bovi left the band. Shortly after, Modà released the single "Quello che non ti ho detto", a pop ballad which peaked at number 4 on the Italian Singles Chart, spending 16 non-consecutive weeks within the top 20.
The song is the lead single from the album with the same title, released on 29 September 2006. After entering the Italian chart at number 14, the album also spawned the singles "Malinconico a metà" and "Grazie gente".

In 2007, Matteo "Tino" Alberti and Manuel Signoretti left the band and were replaced by Enrico Zapparoli and Claudio Dirani, respectively. With the new lineup, Modà started recording their third studio album, Sala d'attesa, which was released in 2008.

2010–2012: Viva i romantici
In 2010, after signing with the record label Ultrasuoni, controlled by three of the most important Italian radio networks, the band released the single "Sono già solo", which became a sleeper hit, peaking at number two on the Italian Singles Chart during its 28th week and later being certified multi-platinum by the Federation of the Italian Music Industry. In October of the same year, the following single "La notte" achieved a similar success in Italy.

In February 2011, the band participated in the 61st Sanremo Music Festival, placing second in the Big Artists Section with their entry "Arriverà", a duet with Italian singer Emma. The song was included in Modà's fourth studio album, released during the same days. Titled Viva i romantici, it debuted at number one on the Italian Albums Chart, holding the top spot for a total amount of six consecutive weeks. The album was later certified diamond by the Federation of the Italian Music Industry and, as of May 2012, it had sold more than 400,000 copies in Italy.

On 16 November the single La Gelosia featuring Bianca Atzei was released .

2013–2014: Gioia
In 2013, the band participated in the 63st Sanremo Music Festival, placing third in the Big Artists Section with their entry "Se si potesse non morire". The song was included in Modà's fifth studio album. Titled "Gioia", it debuted at number one on the Italian Albums Chart, holding the top spot for a total amount of two consecutive weeks. The album was later certified quadruple platinum by the Federation of the Italian Music Industry. It had sold more than 250,000 copies in Italy.
In 2014, the Italian band presents its "Europe & US Tour". Modà played in Spain, Germany (Sold out), Switzerland (Sold out), France (Sold out), Belgium (Sold out), United Kingdom (Sold out) and in New York (Sold out).
The same year, the band played for the first time in the two largest stadiums in Italy: San Siro (Sold out) and Stadio Olimpico

2015–2017: Passione Maledetta
In 2015, the band published its sixth studio album titled "Passione Maledetta". It debuted at number one on the Italian Album Chart and was certified quadruple platinum by the Federation of the Italian Music Industry. It had sold more than 200,000 copies in Italy.
In 2016 the band played again in San Siro two consecutive times

2019–2020: Testa o croce
In 2019, after signing with Warner Chappel Music, Believe and Friends&Partners, the band published its seventh studio album titled "Testa o croce". It debuted at number two on the Italian album Chart and was certified gold. It had sold more than 25,000 copies in italy

In 2020, Modà released Testa o Croce 2020 Edition, a new version of their previous album with new 4 songs

2021–present: Buona Fortuna - Parte Prima 
In 2021, the band published its eighth studio album titled Buona Fortuna - Parte Prima. It debuted at number seven on the Italian album Chart.

On 4  December 2022, it was officially announced their participation in the Sanremo Music Festival 2023. "Lasciami" was later announced as their entry for the Sanremo Music Festival 2023.

Band members
Current members
 Francesco "Kekko" Silvestre – lead vocals (2002–present)
 Diego Arrigoni – electric guitar (2002–present)
 Enrico Zapparoli – guitar (2007–present)
 Stefano Forcella – bass guitar (2002–present)
 Claudio Dirani – drums (2007–present)

Former members
 Manuel Signoretto – drum (2002–2007)
 Matteo "Tino" Alberti – bass guitar (2002–2007)
 Paolo Bovi – keyboards (2002–2006)

Discography

Studio albums

Compilation albums

Live albums

Singles

Featured singles

Awards and nominations

References

Italian pop music groups
Musical groups established in 2002
2002 establishments in Italy
Musical groups from Milan
MTV Europe Music Award winners